The National Union of Workers (NUW) is an active trade union in the tea plantations in Sri Lanka.  The NUW was established in 1965 by V. K. Vellayan, his colleague with the most effective labour force in the tea plantation in Sri Lanka.

Earlier ages of NUW V.K. Vellayan known as peoples leader and commonly VK. He make leaders of the NUW as a labourer of tea estates and also members of the NUW. VK made enthusiastic leadership corrector such as P.V. Kandiah Known as PVK (1 May 1965 to 5 October 2005), Aiyadorai known as mattalai Rohini, Perumal, and Punniya Moorthi. These leaders are gained from estates and VK thought them trade union politice, Leadership and Management and made them as successor in trade union politics in upcountry.

In age of VK's period the NUW gain as leading trade union in Sri Lanka and it had nearly five hundred thousand of member and marched historical labour revolution in the tea plantations in Sri Lanka. VK identified that the Employment provident fund (EPF) is different from the service gratuity. He note this point to the Labour Department and filed a case at supreme court and he won for the voices of laborers.

Aftermath VK's era the NUW fallen it decrees of members. In this time p. Thigambaram elected as President of this Trade Union. He selected for Central Provincial Council from Nuwaraeliya District with Vice Leader M. Udayakumar.

In 2010 parliamentary elections, P. Thigambaram selected for Parliament of Sri Lanka for Nuwaraeliya District. Later in 2015 General Election Mr. P Thigambaram selected to the Parliament with absolute majority in Nuwaraeliya District with M. Thilakarajah who is known as a poet and social activist in Malayagam (Sri Lankan Hill Country). This victory made P. Thigambaram as a Cabinet Minister in Sri Lanka and his voice for the Plantation community is highly appreciated by the youths and social activist.

Trade unions in Sri Lanka
Tamil Progressive Alliance
Tamil political parties in Sri Lanka
Political parties in Sri Lanka
Trade unions established in 1965
1965 establishments in Ceylon
Indian Tamil politicians of Sri Lanka